Polyhex can mean:
 Polyhex (mathematics), a class of mathematical shapes
 Polyhex (Transformers), a fictional city in the Transformers stories